Hallelesis halyma, the western hallelesis, is a butterfly in the family Nymphalidae. It is found in Guinea, Sierra Leone, Liberia, Ivory Coast and western Ghana. The habitat consists of swampy areas inside forests of good quality.

The male androconial organs consist of a pair of large eversible hair-tufts that are attached to the genitalia, within the abdomen.  The smell given off by these organs is powerful and pleasant to the human nose.

References

Elymniini
Butterflies described in 1793